In mathematics, Birch's theorem, named for Bryan John Birch, is a statement about the representability of zero by odd degree forms.

Statement of Birch's theorem
Let K be an algebraic number field, k, l and n be natural numbers, r1, ..., rk be odd natural numbers, and f1, ..., fk be homogeneous polynomials with coefficients in K of degrees r1, ..., rk respectively in n variables. Then there exists a number ψ(r1, ..., rk, l, K) such that if

then there exists an l-dimensional vector subspace V of Kn such that

Remarks
The proof of the theorem is by induction over the maximal degree of the forms f1, ..., fk. Essential to the proof is a special case, which can be proved by an application of the Hardy–Littlewood circle method, of the theorem which states that if n is sufficiently large and r is odd, then the equation

has a solution in integers x1, ..., xn, not all of which are 0.

The restriction to odd r is necessary, since even degree forms, such as positive definite quadratic forms, may take the value 0 only at the origin.

References

Diophantine equations
Analytic number theory
Theorems in number theory